Protoparmelia badia is a species of crustose lichen in the family Parmeliaceae. It is a widely distributed, common species that grows on rocks.

Taxonomy
The lichen was first formally described by German botanist Georg Franz Hoffmann in 1796, as Verrucaria badia. It has been shuffled between several genera in its taxonomic history, and has been associated with many synonyms. In 1986, Austrian lichenologist Josef Hafellner transferred it to the newly created genus Protoparmelia, in which it is the type species.

Description
The thallus of Protoparmelia badia ranges in colour from pale to deep greyish-brown to yellowish brown. It has a texture that is areolate (a pattern of block-like areas similar to cracked dried mud) to verrucose (covered with wartlike projections), and is shiny. Its apothecia are lecanorine (shaped like a plate with a ring around them), and typically measure 0.7–1.5 mm in diameter. The discs are dark red-brown and shiny, while the smooth outer rim is paler. The spores made by this lichen are spindle-shaped (slightly pointed at both ends), measuring 10–16 by 3–7 μm.

Habitat and distribution
Protoparmelia badia is a widespread and common lichen with a circumpolar and arctic-alpine distribution. It is found in western and northeastern North America, mountainous areas of Asia, Europe, temperate South America, Australasia, and Antarctica. It grows on hard, exposed acidic rocks, including granite, basalt and other volcanic rock, rhyolite, and sandstone.

References

Parmeliaceae
Lichen species
Lichens of Antarctica
Lichens of Asia
Lichens of Europe
Lichens of North America
Lichens of South America
Lichens described in 1796
Taxa named by Georg Franz Hoffmann